This is a list of the final 14-man squads named for the 1996 Cricket World Cup in India, Pakistan and Sri Lanka which took place from 14 February 1996 to 17 March 1996. The oldest player at the 1996 Cricket World Cup was Nolan Clarke (47) of The Netherlands while the youngest player was Thomas Odoyo (17) of Kenya.

Australia

Coach:  Geoff Marsh
Oldest Player : Ian Healy (31y 286d)

Youngest Player : Ricky Ponting (21y 53d)

Average Age : 27 y 209d

England

Coach:  Ray Illingworth
Oldest Player : Alec Stewart (32y 308d)
Youngest Player: Dominic Cork (24y 187d)
Average age : 29y 68d
Dermot Reeve was called up for the team as injury replacement for Craig White

India 

Coach/manager:  Ajit Wadekar
Oldest Player: Mohammad Azharuddin (33y 2d)
Youngest Player: Sachin Tendulkar (22y 292d)
Average age: 27y 168d

Kenya

Coach:  Hanumant Singh

Netherlands

New Zealand

Coach:  Glenn Turner
Oldest Player: Dipak Patel (37y 108d)
Youngest Player : Stephen Fleming (22y 315d)
Average age : 27y 14d

Pakistan

Oldest Player : Javed Miandad (38y 243d)
Youngest Player : Saqlain Mushtaq (19y 43d)
Average age: 27y 197d

South Africa

Coach:  Bob Woolmer

Sri Lanka

Coach:  Dav Whatmore

United Arab Emirates

West Indies

Coach:  Andy Roberts

Zimbabwe

References

External links
 1996 World Cup squads. Cricinfo.com.

Cricket World Cup squads
1996 Cricket World Cup